Hunt v. Washington State Apple Advertising Commission, 432 U.S. 333 (1977), was a case in which the Supreme Court of the United States unanimously struck down a North Carolina law prohibiting the sale of apples in closed containers marked with any apple grade other than the United States Department of Agriculture grade. However, displaying the USDA grade was not required. Washington state, a major apple producer, used apple standards superior to those used by the USDA. The Court found that North Carolina's law violated the Commerce Clause because they discriminated against Washington state apple producers while working to the advantage of local North Carolina apple growers.

John R. Jordan, Jr., argued the cause for Hunt. With him on the brief were Rufus L. Edmisten, Attorney General of North Carolina, and Millard R. Rich, Jr., Deputy Attorney General. Slade Gorton, Attorney General of Washington, argued the cause for the Washington State Apple Advertising Commission. With him on the brief were Edward B. Mackie, Deputy Attorney General, and James Arneil, Special Assistant Attorney General.

See also
 List of United States Supreme Court cases, volume 432

External links

United States Constitution Article One case law
United States Supreme Court cases
United States Supreme Court cases of the Burger Court
United States Dormant Commerce Clause case law
1977 in United States case law
Apple production in Washington (state)
Legal history of North Carolina
Food law
Food labelling